Bogthorn is a hamlet which forms part of Keighley in the City of Bradford, West Yorkshire, England. It lies between Exley Head and Oakworth on Keighley Road which is part of the B6143 road.  A Wesleyan chapel was built at the corner of Goose Cote Lane in 1882.

References

Villages in West Yorkshire